Norman Christopher Francis (born March 20, 1931) is a retired African-American academic who served as president of Xavier University of Louisiana from 1968 to 2015. He was the first Black and first lay president of the school, and the second African American to ever serve as president of a Catholic university in the United States.

Francis also served as the chairman of the Louisiana Recovery Authority, the state agency in charge of planning the recovery and rebuilding of Louisiana after Hurricane Katrina and Hurricane Rita. For his various avenues of service, he received the Presidential Medal of Freedom from George W. Bush in 2006, and the Laetare Medal from the University of Notre Dame in 2019.

Biography

Early life and education 

Francis was born in Lafayette, Louisiana, the son of poor parents, neither of whom had finished high school. His father was a barber who rode to work each day on a bicycle because the family did not own a car. He earned pocket money by shining shoes on Lafayette's main street. 

His parents felt that Francis, his three sisters and his brother needed an education. Norman and his brother and sisters attended Catholic schools and his parents saw to it that the children rarely missed school. "I had to have a fever, and really be ill before I dared to try to miss school," he has said. His parents also made certain that the children attended Mass on Sunday and were punctual in their religious duties.

His brother, Joseph Abel Francis, would later become an auxiliary bishop who retired from active ministry in 1995 and died in 1997.

After he graduated from St. Paul High School in 1948, he turned his interest toward the military, but because of the interest of one of the teaching sisters at St. Paul High School, Francis found himself with a work scholarship to Xavier University in New Orleans.

The "work" part of this scholarship landed him in the university library, where he repaired damaged books. By his senior year he had worked himself up to night supervisor of library services. Francis was an honor student and was president of his class all four years. In his senior year he was chosen the president of the student body.. Francis earned a B.S. degree from the university in 1952. He then became the first African-American to enroll at Loyola University New Orleans, where he attended the Loyola University Law School for his J.D., a degree he received in 1955.

He has said that one reason that he was accepted was because he had been active in the National Federation of Catholic Colleges, where he became acquainted with several of the Jesuit fathers on the Loyola University faculty. Francis graduated from Loyola with honors with a Doctor of Jurisprudence degree in 1955 and he began to practice law. He soon decided that the law was not for him. "I could have made a great deal of money," he said later, "but I could help only a few people. The future belongs to those who are educated, so I turned to education."

Career
Francis served in the United States Army from 1956 to 1957 and became a specialist 4. He then rejoined the U.S. Attorney's Office to help integrate federal agencies.

About that same time, Francis acted as counsel for the Xavier student body president, Rudolph Lombard, who had been arrested for attempting to integrate the lunch counter at McCrory's on Canal Street in New Orleans. It was those experiences that led him to choose the path of education over that of a law career.

During the turbulent times just preceding the Civil Rights Movement he returned to Xavier University. In 1961, while dean of men, he played a key role in Xavier's decision to house the Freedom Riders, an integrated group testing application of the Supreme Court decision banning discrimination in interstate rail and bus travel, in a campus dormitory when they were flown to New Orleans by Federal Marshals after having been attacked in three Alabama cities (Anniston, Birmingham and Montgomery). 

Because of his scholastic record, the Sisters of the Blessed Sacrament, the religious order which conducts Xavier University, offered him the post of dean of men, which he accepted. He then began a rose to higher administrative positions at the university. From dean of men in 1957, he advanced to director of student personnel services in 1963, assistant to the president for student affairs in 1964, assistant to the president in charge of development in 1965 and executive vice president in 1967.

In 1968, the Sisters of the Blessed Sacrament promoted him to the post of president of the university, the first lay, male and black head of the university. Coincidentally, he accepted the presidency at Xavier on the same day, April 4, as the assassination of Martin Luther King Jr. in Memphis.

During the following 40 years, Francis guided Xavier University's growth in both size and dimension. The university has more than tripled its enrollment, broadened its curriculum and expanded its campus. At Xavier, Francis presided over a major expansion of campus facilities and enrollment growth of 35 percent.

On September 2, 2014, Francis announced his plan to retire from his post as Xavier's president in June 2015 after serving the university in this capacity for 47 years.

Honors and awards
Francis has been chairman of the board of Educational Testing Service, The Carnegie Foundation for the Advancement of Teaching and the Southern Education Foundation, and president of the American Association of Higher Education and the United Negro College Fund.

He is also a fellow of the American Academy of Arts and Sciences, has received 35 honorary degrees, and was named among the 100 most effective college presidents in a poll published in the Chronicle of Higher Education.

In December 2006, Francis was awarded the Presidential Medal of Freedom.

On November 21, 2008, in New Orleans at the Ernest N. Morial Convention Center, Francis celebrated his 40th year as President of Xavier University at the 40th Anniversary Gala, themed "Legacy for a Legend". The event was hosted by Bill Cosby, and featured a performance by Grammy winner Gladys Knight.

On May 19, 2019, Francis received the University of Notre Dame's 2019 Laetare Medal at Notre Dame's 174th University Commencement Ceremony.

After the George Floyd protests of 2020, the city of New Orleans renamed a street in Francis's honor. The thoroughfare, named for Jefferson Davis (the president of the Confederacy), was renamed to Norman C. Francis Parkway, effective January 1, 2021. The road runs by the southern end of Xavier.

Personal life
Francis was married to his wife Blanche from 1955 until her death in 2015. They had six children.

He was invested as a Knight of Malta in 1991, and is a member of Alpha Phi Alpha fraternity.

Affiliations 
He has served as president of the United Negro College Fund and chairman of the board of directors of the Southern Association of Colleges and Schools and Educational Testing System and of the Southern Education Foundation. He is a member of the National Commission on Excellence in Education, the National Advisory Research Council of the US Department of Health and Human Resources, and the National Assessment of Higher Education Program.

He has been a member of the Vatican's Pontifical Council for Justice and Peace, the advisory board of the Josephites, the executive committee of the college and University Department of the National Catholic Educational Association, the Board of Trustees of the Catholic University of America, the Board of Regents of Loyola University, and the board of directors of the National Catholic Council for Interracial Justice.

References

External links
 Louisiana Recovery Authority biography
 Xavier University president's page
Partnership for Public Service board profile
Norman Francis's oral history video excerpts at The National Visionary Leadership Project
The Historymakers: Norman C. Francis

1931 births
Living people
African-American academics
Knights of Malta
Loyola University New Orleans alumni
Presidential Medal of Freedom recipients
People from Lafayette, Louisiana
People from New Orleans
United States Army soldiers
Heads of universities and colleges in the United States
Xavier University of Louisiana alumni
Catholic University of America trustees
African-American Catholics
Catholics from Louisiana
Laetare Medal recipients
Roman Catholic activists